Lee Yuk-wing  (April 14, 1904 – November 8, 1989) was a Professor of Electrical Engineering at the Massachusetts Institute of Technology. He is best known for adapting and popularizing the pioneering work of Norbert Wiener and for his own research on statistical communication theory.

Biography
Lee was born in Macau, Portugal, and called “Yuwing” or “YW” by his friends. He was a longtime collaborator of Wiener. After obtaining his doctorate at MIT, he returned to China and taught at Tsinghua University. He invited Wiener there in 1935-1937. In 1946 he came back to MIT as a Visiting Professor and initiated his research on statistical communication theory. He then stayed at MIT for 30 years. John Costas, Harry L. Van Trees, Irwin Jacobs and Amar Bose were among his students at MIT. He lived in Belmont, California and died in San Mateo, California.

Publications
 Lee, Y.-W. (1932). Synthesis of electrical networks by means of the Fourier transforms of Laguerre's functions (Unpublished doctoral dissertation). Massachusetts Institute of Technology, Cambridge, MA. 
 Lee, Y.-W. (1950). Application of statistical methods to communication problems (Technical Report No. 181). Cambridge, MA: Research Laboratory of Electronics, Massachusetts Institute of Technology.
 Lee, Y.-W. (1960). Statistical theory of communication. New York: Wiley.

References
 Therrien, C. W. (2002). The Lee-Wiener legacy: Statistical theory of communication. IEEE Signal Processing Magazine, 19(6), 33-34.

External links 

1904 births
1989 deaths
Electrical engineering academics
Communication theorists
American electrical engineers
MIT School of Engineering faculty
Academic staff of Tsinghua University
20th-century American engineers
American people of Macanese descent
Macau scientists